The ultraviolet index, or UV index, is an international standard measurement of the strength of the sunburn-producing ultraviolet (UV) radiation at a particular place and time. It is primarily used in daily and hourly forecasts aimed at the general public.

The UV index is designed as an open-ended linear scale, directly proportional to the intensity of UV radiation that causes human skin to sunburn. A light-skinned individual would experience sunburn in about 30 minutes at UV index 6, without sunscreen. That same individual would experience sunburn in only 15 minutes if the UV index was at 12.

The purpose of the UV index is to help people effectively protect themselves from UV radiation, which has health benefits in moderation but in excess causes sunburn, skin aging, DNA damage, skin cancer, immunosuppression, and eye damage, such as cataracts. The scale was developed by Canadian scientists in 1992, and then adopted and standardized by the UN's World Health Organization and World Meteorological Organization in 1994. Public health organizations recommend that people protect themselves (for example, by applying sunscreen to the skin and wearing a hat and sunglasses) if they spend substantial time outdoors when the UV index is 3 or higher; see the table below for more detailed recommendations.

Description 
The UV index is a linear scale; each increase in value corresponds to a constant decrease in time to sunburn. Higher values represent a greater risk of sunburn (which is correlated with other health risks) due to UV exposure. An index of 0 corresponds to zero UV radiation, as is essentially the case at night. An index of 10 corresponds roughly to midday summer sunlight with a clear sky when the UV index was originally designed; now summertime index values in the tens are common for tropical latitudes, mountainous altitudes, areas with ice/water reflectivity and areas with above-average ozone layer depletion.

While the UV index can be calculated from a direct measurement of the UV spectral power at a given location, as some inexpensive portable devices are able to approximate, the value given in weather reports is usually a prediction based on a computer model. Although this may be in error (especially when cloud conditions are unexpectedly heavy or light), it is usually within ±1 UV index unit as that which would be measured.

When the UV index is presented on a daily basis, it represents UV intensity around the sun's highest point in the day, called solar noon, halfway between sunrise and sunset. This typically occurs between 11:30 and 12:30, or between 12:30 and 13:30 in areas where daylight saving time is being observed. Predictions are made by a computer model that accounts for the effects of sun-earth distance, solar zenith angle, total ozone amount, tropospheric aerosol optical depth, elevation, snow/ice reflectivity and cloud transmission, all of which influence the amount of UV radiation at the surface. The calculations are weighted in favor of the UV wavelengths to which human skin is most sensitive, according to the CIE-standard McKinlay–Diffey erythemal action spectrum. The resulting UV index cannot be expressed in pure physical units, but is a good indicator of likely sunburn damage.

Unlike other common environmental scales such as decibels or the Richter scale, which are logarithmic (the severity multiplies for each step on the scale, growing exponentially), the UV index is linear and increase at a constant rate. This means that an index of 10 is twice as strong as an index of 5.

Technical definition 

The UV index is a number linearly related to the intensity of sunburn-producing UV radiation at a given point on the Earth's surface. It cannot be simply related to the irradiance (measured in W/m2) because the UV of greatest concern occupies a spectrum of wavelengths from 295 to 325 nm, and shorter wavelengths have already been absorbed a great deal when they arrive at the earth's surface. However, skin damage from sunburn is related to wavelength, the shorter wavelengths being much more damaging. The UV power spectrum (expressed as watts per square meter per nanometer of wavelength) is therefore multiplied by a weighting curve known as the erythemal action spectrum, and the result is integrated over the whole spectrum. This gives a weighted figure (sometimes called Diffey-weighted UV irradiance, or DUV, or erythemal dose rate) typically around 250 mW/m2 in the midday summer sunlight. For convenience, this is divided by 25 mW/m2 to produce an index nominally from 0 to 11+, though ozone depletion is now resulting in higher values.

To illustrate the spectrum weighting principle, the incident power density in midday summer sunlight is typically 0.6 mW/(nm m2) at 295 nm, 74 mW/(nm m2) at 305 nm, and 478 mW/(nm m2) at 325 nm. (Note the huge absorption that has already taken place in the atmosphere at short wavelengths.)
The erythemal weighting factors applied to these figures are 1.0, 0.22, and 0.003 respectively. (Also note the huge increase in sunburn damage caused by the shorter wavelengths; e.g., for the same irradiance, 305 nm is 22% as damaging as 295 nm, and 325 nm is 0.3% as damaging as 295 nm.) Integration of these values using all the intermediate weightings over the full spectral range of 290 nm to 400 nm produces a figure of 264 mW/m2 (the DUV), which is then divided by 25 mW/m2 to give a UV index of 10.6.

History 
After sporadic attempts by various meteorologists to define a "sunburn index" and growing concern about ozone depletion, Environment Canada scientists James B. Kerr, C. Thomas McElroy, and David I. Wardle invented the modern UV index in Toronto, Ontario. Environment Canada launched it as part of the weather forecast on May 27, 1992, making Canada the first country in the world to issue official predictions of UV levels for the next day. Many other countries followed suit with their own UV indices. Initially, the methods of calculating and reporting a UV index varied significantly from country to country. A global UV index, first standardized by the World Health Organization and World Meteorological Organization in 1994, gradually replaced the inconsistent regional versions, specifying not only a uniform calculation method (the Canadian definition) but also standard colors and graphics for visual media.

On December 29, 2003, a world-record ground-level UV index of 43.3 was detected at Bolivia's Licancabur volcano, though other scientists dispute readings higher than 26.

In 2005, Australia and the United States
launched the UV Alert. While the two countries have different baseline UV intensity requirements before issuing an alert, their common goal is to raise awareness of the dangers of over-exposure to the Sun on days with intense UV radiation.

In 2007, the United Nations honored UV index inventors Kerr, McElroy, and Wardle with the Innovators Award for their far-reaching work on reducing public health risks from UV radiation. In the same year, a survey among meteorologists ranked the development of the UV index as #11 on The Weather Channel's 100 Biggest Weather Moments.

In 2022, a new mobile phone application that provides localized information on ultraviolet (UV) radiation levels has been launched by the World Health Organization (WHO), the World Meteorological Organization (WMO), the United Nations Environment Programme (UNEP) and the International Labour Organization (ILO).

Index usage 
The recommendations below are for average adults with lightly tanned skin  (Fitzpatrick scale of skin colour: Type II). Those with darker skin (Type IV+) are more likely to withstand greater sun exposure, while extra precautions are needed for children, seniors, particularly fair-skinned adults, and those who have greater sun sensitivity for medical reasons or from UV exposure in previous days.

When the day's predicted UV index is within various numerical ranges, the recommendations for protection are as follows:

See also 
 Fitzpatrick scale
 Health effects of sunlight exposure
 Sun protective clothing
 Sunscreen

References

External links 
 Real-time Global Ultraviolet Index - A graphical view of the current UV index for the globe.
 Radiation: The ultraviolet (UV) index - World Health Organization
 Europe UV Index Forecast - European Climate and Health Observatory
 Australian UV Index Forecast - Australian Bureau of Meteorology
 United States UV index forecast - National Weather Service: Climate Prediction Center
 UV Index Forecasts - UV Index Today: Hourly USA UV Index Forecasts

Sun tanning
Atmospheric radiation
Ozone depletion
Meteorological indices
Hazard scales